Rank comparison chart of navies of Asian states.

Enlisted

See also 
 Comparative navy officer ranks of Asia

References

Asia
Military comparisons